The 2022–23 Serbian First League is the 18th season of the Serbian First League since its establishment.

League format
The league consist of 16 teams: seven teams from the previous season, one team relegated from 2021–22 Serbian SuperLiga, five new teams promoted from Serbian League and Novi Sad 1921 who was merged with Proleter Novi Sad. Each time will play each other twice in round-robin format after which top half will play in Promotion round and bottom half in Relegation round Play-offs. First two teams from the Promotion round will be promoted to next season of Serbian Superliga, while third and fourth team will play in a Promotion Play-off. Last four teams from Relegation round will be relegated.

Teams

Regular season

League table

Results

Individual statistics

Top goalscorers
As of matches played on 16 March 2023.

Hat-tricks

References

External links
 Official website
 srbijasport.net
 soccerway.com

Serbian First League seasons
2022–23 in Serbian football leagues
Serbia
Serbian First League